María Cecilia Barbetta (born 8 July 1972 in Buenos Aires) is a German-language writer. Since 2011 she is a member of the PEN Centre Germany. In 2008, she won the Aspekte-Literaturpreis.

Life 
Barbetta studied German as a foreign language in her native Argentina. She came to Berlin in 1996 with a DAAD scholarship. After completing her doctorate at the Free University of Berlin in 2000, she has been a freelance author (since 2005). In 2007 she was awarded the Alfred Döblin Fellowship by the Academy of Arts, Berlin, and participated in the author's workshop Prosa of the Literary Colloquium in Berlin. Los Milagros Tailor's Shop was her first novel. She spent the year 2013 at Villa Massimo in Rome. In 2014 she received scholarships from the Berlin Senate and the German Literature Fund Darmstadt. She writes in German and has lived in Berlin since 1996.

Awards
 2008 Aspekte-Literaturpreis
 2009 Adelbert von Chamisso-Förderpreis
 2017 Alfred Döblin Prize

Memberships
 2011 PEN Centre Germany

Works

References

External links 
 

1972 births
Living people
Writers from Buenos Aires
Argentine emigrants to Germany
German women novelists
21st-century German novelists
21st-century German women writers
Writers from Berlin